Samuel Peal was a British manufacturer who developed a method of waterproofing cloth by treating it with a mixture of turpentine and rubber.

English inventors
1754 births
Year of death missing